Lead stearate is a metal-organic compound, a salt of lead and stearic acid with the chemical formula . The compound is classified as a metallic soap, i.e. a metal derivative of a fatty acid. The compound is toxic.

Synthesis
The compound can be prepared by reacting stearic acid, lead(II) oxide, and a catalyst acetic acid.
 

Also, an exchange reaction between lead(II) acetate and sodium stearate:

Physical properties
White powder with a slight fatty odor. Sinks in water. Hygroscopic in air.

Slightly soluble in water. Soluble in hot ethanol.

Uses
The compound is used as a drier in oil paints and varnishes to speed the polymerization and oxidation processes. Also used as a lubricant and stabilizer in vinyl polymers and as a corrosion inhibitor in petroleum products.

References

Stearates
Lead compounds